Over the Rainbow is the debut studio album from Italian-born American Dance singer Nocera, which was released through Sleeping Bag Records in 1987. The set, co-produced and co-written by Nocera and Floyd Fisher, featured additional contributions from songwriter/producer Peitor Angell, musician/programmer/composer Fred Zarr, producer/editor/mixer Chep Nuñez and Freestyle production duo The Latin Rascals (aka Albert Cabrera and Tony Moran). Two singles from this album became top ten hits on Billboard's Dance/Disco Club Play Charts: the #2 hit "Summertime Summertime" in 1986, and "Let's Go," which peaked at #8 in 1987. Another single, "Tell U So", was released in 1987. This was the only album released by Nocera as a follow up was shelved due to the closing of Sleeping Bag Records in 1992.

Track listing

References

External links
 [ AllMusic.com Biography - Nocera]
 Discogs.com Profile - Nocera
 lulunocera.com - Artist's website

1987 debut albums
Nocera (singer) albums